Bagration-Davitashvili is a Georgian noble family, a cadet branch of the Kakhetian line of the Bagrationi royal dynasty. In turn, Kakhetian line descends from George VIII, last king of the united Georgian kingdom and first king of Kakheti. Their ancestry traces back to the Kakhetian prince Davit whose father, Demetre, was blinded by his brother George II the Wicked after the latter killed his reigning father Alexander I, and usurped the crown in 1511.

The Bagration-Davitashvili fled Kakheti to the neighboring Georgian kingdom of Kartli where they persisted as a princely family. After the annexation of Georgia by Imperial Russia, the family, in the person of Solomon Bagration-Davitashvili, was confirmed in princely dignity (Bagration-Davidov or Bagration-Davidoff) on December 21, 1849.

References 

Branches of the Bagrationi dynasty
Noble families of Georgia (country)
Russian noble families
Georgian-language surnames